Anna Náprstková (24 April 1788, Prague – 20 October 1873, Prague) was a Czech businesswoman and philanthropist. She made a name for herself as a brewer in Sturm in the Old Town of Prague with her second husband Antonín Fingerhut, whom she married in 1823. The couple bought the Renaissance house U Halánků House, which they converted into a distillery and wine shop. It became a successful business.

Náprstková became known for charitable work, particularly her patronage of national events and education. A trip to the United States in the 1840s inspired Náprstková to take a proactive role in development. She was responsible for the establishment of an industrial museum and the American Ladies Club at U Halánků House on Bethlehem Square.

She has been described as a "determined and life-hardened woman who had an extraordinary business spirit but also an open heart and hands for those who needed it."

References

Czech women in business
Czech philanthropists
Businesspeople in brewing
1788 births
1873 deaths
Businesspeople from Prague
19th-century Czech businesspeople
19th-century philanthropists
19th-century businesswomen